Ruslan Zudiyevich Ablayev (born 29 June 1972) is a Russian professional football coach and a former player. He works as a goalkeeping coach with FC Fakel Voronezh.

Club career
He played one season in the Russian Premier League in 1992 for FC Fakel Voronezh.

External links
 

1972 births
People from Sughd Region
Living people
Soviet footballers
Russian footballers
Russian Premier League players
FC Fakel Voronezh players
Association football goalkeepers
FC Sheksna Cherepovets players
Russian football managers